Sakhavaram is a village in Nellore District, Andhra Pradesh, India.

Geography 
Nearest town is Kandukur to which it has road connectivity. It comes under Voletivaripalem mandal. Its pincode is 523113.

Population 
Sakhavaram village has population of 2992 of which 1454 are males while 1538 are females as per Population Census 2011 with 728 families residing in total.

Administration 
As per constitution of India and Panchayati Raj Act, Sakhavaram village is administrated by Sarpanch (Head of Village) who is elected representative of village.

School 
There are 3 MPPS and 1 ZPHS schools located in Sakhavaram.

Banking 
There is branch of Indian Bank located in the village.

References

Villages in Prakasam district